The 2023 European Throwing Cup was held from 11 to 12 March 2023 in Leiria, Portugal.

Results

Men

Seniors

U23

Women

Seniors

U23

Medal table

Participating Issue
Because of Russian invasion of Ukraine, Russia and Belarus were banned.

References

External link

European Throwing Cup
European Throwing Cup
European Throwing Cup
European Throwing Cup